Álvaro Maximiliano Arias Invernizzi (born 3 October 1988) is a Uruguayan retired footballer. Arias has partial Italian descent on his mother's side.

Club career
Arias made his debut in the first team of Peñarol in 2005, remaining at the club in Montevideo until 2009, when he moved to Fénix, always playing in the top division.

In February 2010 he was signed by Romanian side Astra Giurgiu.

In mid-2010, after remaining six months in Europe, Arias came back to Uruguay now signing with Rampla Juniors.

On 25 June 2011, it was announced that he was sold to Querétaro F.C. of Mexico.

On 31 January 2013, Arias signed a new contract with Serie B side Brescia Calcio.

International career
He was an unused member at 2005 FIFA U-17 World Championship.

References

External links
 
 
 

1988 births
Living people
Uruguayan footballers
Uruguayan expatriate footballers
Association football defenders
Peñarol players
Centro Atlético Fénix players
Club Atlético River Plate (Montevideo) players
FC Astra Giurgiu players
Querétaro F.C. footballers
Brescia Calcio players
Liverpool F.C. (Montevideo) players
Rampla Juniors players
El Tanque Sisley players
Liga I players
Liga MX players
Serie B players
Uruguayan Primera División players
Uruguayan people of Italian descent
Expatriate footballers in Italy
Expatriate footballers in Mexico
Expatriate footballers in Romania
Uruguayan expatriate sportspeople in Italy
Uruguayan expatriate sportspeople in Mexico
Uruguayan expatriate sportspeople in Romania